Tamworth is a market town and borough in Staffordshire, England,  north-east of Birmingham. The town borders North Warwickshire to the east and north, Lichfield to the north, south-west and west. The town takes its name from the River Tame, which flows through it. The wider urban area had a population of 81,964.

Tamworth was the principal centre of royal power of the Anglo-Saxon Kingdom of Mercia during the 8th and 9th centuries. It hosts a simple but elevated 12th century castle, a well-preserved medieval church (the Church of St Editha) and a Moat House. Tamworth was historically divided between Warwickshire and Staffordshire until 1889, when the town was placed entirely in Staffordshire.

The town's industries include logistics, engineering, clothing, brick, tile and paper manufacture. Until 2001 one of its factories was Reliant, which produced the Reliant Robin three-wheeler car and the Reliant Scimitar sports car.

History

Romans
When the Romans arrived in Britain, (43–409 CE) the Trent Valley was home to the British Coritani tribe. Evidence of Roman activity in the area of Tamworth consists of fragments of Roman building materials found near Bolebridge Street. Tamworth was near the Roman road, Watling Street and a few miles from the Roman town of Letocetum.

Anglo-Saxon
Following the end of Roman rule, the area around the Tame valley was occupied by Anglo-Saxons from northern Germany and Jutland. Stephen Pollington states that the settlers that reached Tamworth were Angles, who left their homelands after rising sea levels flooded much of the land. Britain offered an attractive option as its landscape was similar to their homelands, but was more fertile and had a more moderate climate. The Angles arrived from the north, navigating inland via the River Humber, River Trent and the River Tame.

The settlers established themselves in "an open meadow by the Tame" which they called "Tomworðig". Nearby they established an "enclosed estate" called "Tomtun" – Tame-town – fortified with a palisade wall. These people called themselves the "Tomsaete": Tame-settlers. Tomtun was initially "not much more than a fortified manor". The settlement straddled the River Anker and contained a "large hall for public gatherings" as well as individual homes and agricultural buildings such as stables and granaries. The Lords of Tame-Settlers quickly became wealthy and Tamworth was thus able to be fortified further.

The Tomsaete were a military tribe; however, soldiers eventually reached an age where they retired from military duty and were then allotted parcels of land to farm, manage and defend. Fertile lands surrounding the rivers were allotted first, then the hill lands; this land spreading further and further, spreading the power and influence of the tribes. The Tomsaete were one of countless tribes "all vying for power and influence", however the Lords of the Tomsaete came to control and to "dominate" the area known as English Midlands. The tribes initially ruled through unions and alliances of leading families and there is evidence of contact with families across England and also back in the Anglo-Saxon homelands. However, this "warlord" form of government developed and the Tomsaete's lands became a Kingdom with a single leader.

Mercian 'capital'
The Tomsaete lived in the heartland of what by the late 6th century had become the Kingdom of Mercia, the largest of the kingdoms in what is now England. Under King Penda in the 7th century, it became the most powerful. The King was not static and would not have a single residence; instead he travelled round his territories "to be seen by his people, to give legal judgments, to reward loyalty and to try offenders". Tamworth was likely a stopping place on the royal circuit, becoming a royal vill from the seventh century, with an early minster church and river crossing. It was fortified as a burh in the late 8th century, with an earthen rampart and timber palisade surrounded by a ditch.
 

By the end of the 8th century it had been established by King Offa of Mercia (757–796) as the stable centre of royal power for his expanding political ambitions – more like a capital than had previously been seen anywhere in Anglo-Saxon England. One of the earliest surviving written records mentioning Tamworth dates from Offa's reign; a grant of land to monks at Worcester dating from 781, signed by Offa, King of Mercia, addressed from his royal palace at Tamworthie. Offa built what was described as a Royal palace at Tamworth, however this was almost certainly a timber and thatch construction (as were most buildings in Anglo-Saxon England) which left little physical trace, and so the location of Offa's palace has never been identified, although excavations north of Bolebridge Street in 1968 revealed what appeared to be the outline of a large Saxon building.

Between 790 and 850 Tamworth was the main location for the signature of Mercian royal charters. In 868 the Great Heathen Army invaded England and in 874 they drove out King Burgred, who fled to Rome. Tamworth was then a frontier town between Viking ruled east Mercia and Anglo-Saxon ruled west Mercia until 913, when Æthelflæd, Lady of the Mercians, made Tamworth her capital, and re-fortified the town against Viking attacks.  Æthelflæd led a successful military campaign to win back territory from the Danes, driving them back to their stronghold at Derby which was then captured. She died at Tamworth on 6 June 918.

During the reign of Æthelstan (924-939) the Kingdom enjoyed a period of relative peace and prosperity. In Tamworth church in 926, a sister of King Æthelstan, perhaps Saint Edith of Polesworth, was married to Sitric Cáech, the squint-eyed Norse King of York and Dublin. It was during this period that a mint was established at Tamworth producing silver coins, many stamped with the name of a local moneyer called Manna. Many coins produced in Tamworth during this period have appeared in Scandinavian museums, as much of it was used to pay Danegeld, a tribute paid in an attempt to buy off invading Vikings. This however proved fruitless, as following Æthelstan's death in 939, Tamworth was again plundered and devastated by Viking invaders led by Sitric's son Olaf (later called Amlaíb Cuarán). It was soon recovered and rebuilt by Æthelstan's, successors, but Tamworth never regained its pre-eminence as a Royal centre.

In the early 10th century the new shires of Staffordshire and Warwickshire were created, and Tamworth was divided between them, with the county border running through the town centre along the streets of Gungate, Church Street, Silver Street and Holloway, with the castle on the Warwickshire side of the border. The reason for this division was likely so that the town would be divided between the two separately administered Hundreds of Offlow and Hemlingford to ensure that sufficient manpower would be available to man the town's defences.

Norman and Medieval

Following the Norman conquest of England in the 11th century, the Normans built a large motte and bailey castle, the forerunner of the present Tamworth Castle, partly on the site of the Saxon fort which still stands to this day. Unusually Tamworth wasn't mentioned in the Domesday Book; this may have been due to its division between two counties confusing the surveyors.

From around 1093, the Marmion family became lords of the manor, and eight generations of Marmions inhabited Tamworth Castle until 1294. It was the Marmions who were largely responsible for building the present sandstone fort at Tamworth Castle, replacing the original wooden Norman structure. During the period of The Anarchy in the 12th century, Robert Marmion supported King Steven in his fight with Empress Matilda. In the ensuing struggle, Tamworth Castle was taken and occupied by the forces of Matilda, but was returned to the Marmions when Steven finally prevailed in the war. In 1215 King John threatened to have Tamworth Castle destroyed, in revenge for the 3rd Baron Marmion's support for the baronial revolt against the King. However, this threat was not carried out.

In the Middle Ages Tamworth was a small market town. However, the king gave it charters in 1319. In 1337 Tamworth was granted the right to hold two annual fairs. In the Middle Ages fairs were like markets but they were held only once a year and they attracted buyers and sellers from great distances. In 1345 Tamworth suffered a disastrous fire, and much of the town burned. This was followed by the Black Death which arrived in England from 1348, which reduced the population by at least a third. However, the town eventually recovered from these disasters.

16th and 17th centuries
Queen Elizabeth I granted Tamworth another charter in 1560 confirming the town's existing rights and privileges, and incorporating it as a unified borough with a single municipal corporation. Prior to this there had been separate corporations for the Warwickshire and Staffordshire sides of the town. The charted enabled Tamworth to elect a representative to Parliament. Another charter was granted in 1588, further consolidating the town's rights of self-government.
 
Tamworth suffered from outbreaks of plague in 1563, 1579, 1606, and 1626. Many died but each time the population recovered.

James I, the first Stuart king of England, visited Tamworth on three occasions, with his first visit in 1619, and was accommodated by Sir John Ferrers at Tamworth Castle. The king was accompanied by Prince Charles (the future king Charles I), who was entertained by William Comberford at the Moat House.

During the English Civil War from 1642, Tamworth Castle was initially garrisoned for the Royalists under William Comberford, however in June 1643 it was captured by a detachment of Parliamentarian forces under the command of William Purefoy after a short two-day siege, and remained in Parliamentarian hands for the remainder of the conflict, despite unsuccessful attempts by Royalists who controlled nearby Lichfield to recapture it. In 1646, a large Parliamentarian force, backed by soldiers from Tamworth captured Lichfield after a four-month siege. After the conflict was over, the castle was again threatened with destruction, when an order was issued for it to be destroyed, but again this was not carried out.

Tamworth continued to grow and remained one of the most populous towns in the Midlands by 1670, when the combined hearth tax returns from Warwickshire and Birmingham list a total of some 320 households. Its strategic trade advantage lay with control of the two vital packhorse bridges across the Anker and the Tame on the route from London to Chester. As today, a market town, it did a brisk trade providing travellers with at least staple bread, ale and accommodation, maintaining trading links as far afield as Bristol. Charles II's reconfirmation of its borough's privileges in 1663 gave the town an added boost, as confirmed by Richard Blome's description of its celebrated market, well served with corn, provisions and lean cattle.

18th and 19th centuries
The town grew rapidly in the 18th and 19th centuries during the Industrial Revolution, benefiting from the surrounding coal mines. It also became connected to the canal network, with the Coventry Canal being built through the town. The late 18th century saw further improvements in the local transport infrastructure, and the beginnings of industrialisation: In 1770 the Tamworth Turnpike trust was established, which set about making improvements to the roads in and around the town. In 1777 the Trent and Mersey Canal was completed, running to within a few miles of Tamworth. In 1790 the Coventry Canal was completed through Tamworth, linking Tamworth to the growing national canal network, a junction was soon made between this and the Birmingham and Fazeley Canal.

Influence of the Peel family

Robert 'parsley' Peel (1723–1795) a Lancashire cotton mill owner was the first member of the Peel family to become established in the area. Peel had become well known for producing textiles with a parsley leaf design, this led him to becoming known as 'Parsley' Peel. After his mills in Lancashire were damaged by riots, Peel moved his mill operations to Burton upon Trent in Staffordshire in 1780, attracted in part due to the improving local transport systems.

His son, Sir Robert Peel, 1st Baronet (1750–1830) played a major role in developing Tamworth's economy, he established the first cotton mills in Tamworth in 1788, one of which, known as 'Castle Mill' was based in Tamworth Castle. Textiles soon became Tamworth's main industry. Peel also established several banks in Tamworth. Peel moved permanently from Lancashire, and set up home in Drayton Manor just outside Tamworth in the 1790s. He became the town's Member of Parliament in 1790, and remained so until 1820. He used his parliamentary influence to improve the working conditions in factories.

By far the most famous member of the Peel family, was his son Sir Robert Peel, 2nd Baronet (1788–1850) who rose to become one of the most famous Prime Ministers of the Victorian era, and served as the town's Member of Parliament from 1830 until his death in 1850. He lived at the nearby Drayton Manor. It was in Tamworth that Robert Peel unveiled his Tamworth Manifesto in 1834 which created what is now the modern Conservative Party. While Home Secretary, Peel helped create the modern concept of the police force, leading to officers being known as "bobbies" or "Peelers". Peel is commemorated in Tamworth by a statue in front of the town hall, which was produced by Matthew Noble in 1852.

Improvements
There were a number of improvements to Tamworth during the 19th century. In 1807 the pavements were flagged. 1809 A new church entrance was completed and a new organ erected funded by public subscriptions. (source see 1809 Parish Records). From 1835 Tamworth had gaslight. In the late 19th century a piped water supply was created.

The railways arrived with the Midland Railway route from Derby to Birmingham arriving in Tamworth in 1847, and later the London and North Western Railway, which provided direct trains to the capital. A split-level station exists where the two main lines cross each another, the higher-level platforms (on the Derby to Birmingham line), being at right angles to the lower ones on the main line to London.

The first municipal cemetery opened in 1876. The Assembly Rooms were built in 1889. In 1897 the corporation bought Tamworth Castle.

A hospital was built in Tamworth in 1880 and was funded by one of the town's greatest benefactors, William MacGregor, at his own expense. An infirmary was built in 1903. MacGregor also built two churches at Glascote and Hopwas and had the bells at St. Editha's church recast. He also started a free library, a working men's club, a school (Now called William MacGregor School) and started the Co-operative society in the town in 1885 acting as guarantor.

Tamworth was historically divided between Warwickshire and Staffordshire, with the county boundary running along the town centre. The boundary was re-drawn following the Local Government Act 1888, which created county councils. The Act decreed that urban areas, such as Tamworth, which were situated in more than one county, should transfer entirely into the county which contained the larger portion of the population at the 1881 census: In Tamworth's case, the Staffordshire part of Tamworth Borough contained 2,589 people and the Warwickshire part, 2,032, therefore Tamworth became part of Staffordshire from 1 April 1889.

During the 19th century the Tamworth pig, a long-bodied, heavily bristled breed, was first sold here by cross-breeding pigs available locally with imported Irish stock.

Modern history
The first council houses in Tamworth were built in 1900. More were built in the 1920s and 1930s and after 1945.

The first public library in Tamworth was built in 1905. Tamworth gained an electricity supply in 1924.

Tamworth grew rapidly in the postwar years as it soaked up overspill from the West Midlands conurbation to the southwest. A population of about 7,000 in 1931 had risen to some 13,000 just after the Second World War; this figure remained fairly static until the late 1960s when a major expansion plan was implemented. Although not officially a "New Town", Tamworth's expansion resembled the development of many new towns. As part of this plan the town boundaries were expanded to include the industrial area around Wilnecote to the south. The 1961 population of the new enlarged area was 25,000. In 1971 it was 40,000; in 1981, 64,000; in 1991, 68,000 and in 2001, 72,000, meaning that the town's population had almost doubled within 30 years.

The Reliant Motor Company was founded in Tamworth in 1935 by T. L. Williams and E. S. Thompson, and cars such as the Scimitar four wheeled sports cars and the Robin three wheeled economy cars were manufactured here until the company moved to Cannock in 1998. A year later the old factory was razed to the ground and a new housing estate built in its place called "Scimitar Park" with street names assuming names of Reliant vehicles (e.g. Robin Close).

The A5 dual-carriageway Fazeley, Two Gates and Wilnecote Bypass opened in July 1995, acting both as a bypass of Watling Street, and as a fast route for traffic into the town. This was further extended to meet the M6 Toll and A38 in 2005. The road's official name is Thomas Guy Way.

Tamworth has six designated Local Nature Reserves, Hodge Lane (Amington), Kettlebrook, Tameside, Dosthill Park, Warwickshire Moor and Broadmeadow, which became the newest nature reserve in April 2013.

Historic population

* population figures based on current borough boundaries.

Geography
Tamworth is located at the confluence of the rivers Tame and Anker, which meet just south of the town centre.

Tamworth's built-up area includes Fazeley which is to the south-west of Tamworth, on the opposite bank of the River Tame, Fazeley is not part of Tamworth borough, instead it is administered as part of the Lichfield District. The built-up area of Tamworth and Fazeley was recorded as having a population of 81,964 in the 2011 census.

Other nearby places include Polesworth, Atherstone and Sutton Coldfield, with Nuneaton, Burton upon Trent, Walsall and Rugeley a bit further afield.

Suburbs

Tamworth has a number of suburbs:

 Amington
 Belgrave
 Bitterscote
 Bolehall
 Borough Park
 Coton Green
 Dosthill
 Gillway
 Glascote
 Glascote Heath
 Hockley
 Kettlebrook
 Lakeside
 Leyfields
 Perry Crofts
 Quarry Hill
 Riverside
 Stonydelph
 The Alders
 The Leys
 Two Gates
 Wilnecote

Demography
According to the 2011 census the borough has a population of 76,900. White British is the predominant ethnicity, then 97% of the population. The second largest ethnicity is White Irish, making up 0.9%. 95% of people in the borough were born in England, with Scotland ranking next, with 1% of the population.

Tamworth was in 2013 the most overweight town in the UK with a 30.7% obesity rate.

Governance

Tamworth Borough is administered by a Council which has been local Conservative Party-led since 2004 and was Labour Party-led from 1990 to 2004. No part of the borough has a civil parish. On Staffordshire county council, Tamworth has six divisions, all of which are held by the Conservatives.

Since 2011, Tamworth has formed part of the Greater Birmingham & Solihull Local Enterprise Partnership along with neighbouring authorities Birmingham, Bromsgrove, Cannock Chase, East Staffordshire, Lichfield, Redditch, Solihull and Wyre Forest. Tamworth is also a non-constituent member of the West Midlands Combined Authority.

The council retains a cabinet system of governance.

Elections

Tamworth Council elects by thirds meaning there is an election of 1 councillor for each of the wards every year for three years but the fourth year see elections to Staffordshire County Council. Councillors are elected for a four-year term.

The borough is used as the starting point of the extent of the Westminster seat of Tamworth since 2010 represented by Christopher Pincher, a Conservative.

Health
Tamworth has a minor hospital called Sir Robert Peel Hospital which is located in Mile Oak. The Sir Robert Peel Hospital has a Minor Injuries Unit.

Tamworth is part of the South Staffordshire and Shropshire Healthcare NHS Foundation trust.

Religion

Christianity is the largest religion in Tamworth, comprising 77% of the population. 15% are not religious. Other religions include Hindu (177), Islam (127) and Sikhism (124) which make up 0.9% of the population.

Church of England
The parish church of Tamworth is the Church of St Editha in the town centre, which is one of the towns prominent and oldest landmarks being a grade I listed building. Most of Tamworth is part of the Diocese of Lichfield, the two parishes being Tamworth and Wilnecote. However Amington is in the parish of Amington St. Editha which is part of the Diocese of Birmingham.

Roman Catholicism
Tamworth is in the Roman Catholic Archdiocese of Birmingham; the main Roman Catholic church is St John the Baptist on St John Street in the town centre, the other Roman Catholic church is Sacred Heart Church in Glascote.

Culture

Scientific
Sir Ernest William Titterton was born in Tamworth. He was a research officer for the British Admiralty during World War II before becoming in 1943 a member of the British mission to the U.S. to participate in the Manhattan Project which developed the atomic bomb. He was knighted in 1970.

Music

Former The Teardrop Explodes frontman and solo artist/writer Julian Cope was raised in Tamworth and later lived in nearby Drayton Bassett. Cope recorded three solo albums during his Tamworth years, World Shut Your Mouth (1984), Fried (1984) and Saint Julian (1987), and all three used various locations around Tamworth for their sleeve art and several videos.

The heavy rock band Wolfsbane cut their teeth in the town, before their lead singer Blaze Bayley went on to front Iron Maiden.

Rock guitarist Clem Clempson was born in Tamworth. Bob Catley the lead singer of rock band Magnum (band) also lives in Tamworth.

Guitarist/vocalist/songwriter/ producer Phil Bates (Trickster, ELO Pt2, Quill and solo artist) was born in Tamworth, and played in local bands the Teenbeats and Source of Power until moving away from the area in 1971. Phil still has strong family and musical connections with Tamworth.

Amington Band are a traditional British brass band based in their own band room. They have been based in the village of Amington since the 1910s

Transport

Road
The main road running through Tamworth is the A5 bypass. The M42 motorway runs to the east of Tamworth and the town is served by junction 10 which also contains Tamworth services.

The Egg Roundabout
The Egg is a magic roundabout in Tamworth, Staffordshire at its heart. The Egg forms the junction of the A51, A453 and A513 and terminates the B5000. It consists of the roads Ankerdrive and Bolebridge Street, and is listed as being part of the A51. The Egg has a cinema complex and restaurant in the centre, and has the River Anker running through it. The Snowdome and Tamworth FC also directly adjoin the junction. The Egg was voted the fourth worst roundabout in Britain in 2005.

Railways
Tamworth railway station located on Victoria Road serves the town. Tamworth Station is a high- and low-level station and serves as an interchange between the West Coast Mainline and the Cross Country Route. It consists of four platforms. A station called Wilnecote railway station on the Cross Country Route serves the suburbs of Wilnecote and Two Gates.

Airport
The nearest airports to Tamworth are Birmingham and East Midlands.

Buses

Bus services around the town are operated by Arriva Midlands North, Diamond Bus, Flexibus, and Stagecoach Midlands. Arriva and Stagecoach operating services to Atherstone and Nuneaton. Arriva also operates services 65 and X65 to Lichfield and service 110 to Birmingham via Fazeley, Sutton Coldfield and Erdington. There are also buses that operate on limited timetables such as the bus service to Coleshill (provided by Flexibus) who only operate once a week on a thursday with one service each way. There is a Midland Classic service to Rodbaston College from Bonehill from Monday-Friday for pupils and staff there only. As well as a National Express West Midlands service from Wilnecote to Aldridge via Tamworth for St Francis College also Monday-Friday. There are also bus services connecting the town with its suburbs and to the newly built Mercia Park near Ashby-de-la-Zouch in Leicestershire.

Canal
The Coventry Canal runs through Tamworth; at Fazeley Junction, just outside Tamworth, it joins the Birmingham and Fazeley Canal. At Fradley Junction a few miles north-west of Tamworth, the Coventry Canal joins the Trent and Mersey Canal.

Twin towns
Tamworth's town twins are:

Blue plaques

Tamworth currently has two historical blue plaques. The first is positioned on the old Bank House on Lady Bank by the Tamworth Civic Society and commemorates the Tamworth Savings Bank that was founded on 1823. More recently on 8 July 2017, a blue plaque was unveiled by Tamworth Heritage Trust and the Reliant Motor Club at Bro-Dawel on the Kettlebrook Road to honour Reliant's founders, Mr T. L. Williams and Mr E. S. Thompson, and marks the birthplace of the first Reliant prototype built in 1934.

Sport

Football
One of the more notable personalities to come from Tamworth is former Manchester City goalkeeper Tony Coton, who made a number of appearances over the years. Tamworth F.C. has also fielded a number of notable players in recent times, including West Brom legend Bob Taylor and, for one match in the 2005–06 season, former Aston Villa and Arsenal midfielder Paul Merson. Tamworth F.C. showed signs of progress, just surviving to get their third season in the Conference, playing teams such as Halifax Town, Oxford United & Kidderminster Harriers on a regular basis. The club also has a keen rivalry with fellow Staffordshire clubs Stafford Rangers and Burton Albion. However, their biggest rivals are Nuneaton Town. In 2009, as winners of Conference North, Tamworth were promoted to the Conference Premier.

Other football players from Tamworth include goalkeeper Martin Taylor who played for Derby County and Wycombe Wanderers, and current Wales international Ashley Williams who plays for Everton in the Premier League. Leicester City footballer Marc Albrighton is also from Tamworth.

Bowls
Tamworth Castle Bowling Club was founded in 1814 it can boast Mayors and Prime ministers as past members. This crown green bowling club is situated behind a green door on Ladybank in the shadow of Tamworth Castle. The club is owned by its membership with a season running from March to October.

Tamworth and District Indoor Bowling Club officially founded and opened in 1990. A fire destroyed the Club just after it was originally built delaying its opening by about 12 months. This is the only indoor bowling club in Staffordshire and with over 350 members it is actively involved at Club, County and National levels of competition. There is an active junior section with County representatives to under 25 age group. Bowling for people with disabilities is a very important part of the club as is coaching for all players. Owned by its membership the club has an Outdoor green operating April to September whilst the Indoor rinks are open throughout the year. The club is in Eagle Drive, Amington, Tamworth just before the Municipal Golf Course.

Speedway
Speedway racing took place in the Tamworth area in the 1930s and in the post war era featured at the Greyhound Stadium in Mile Oak. The Hounds started out in 1947 racing in the National League Division Three before becoming The Tammies in 1950 when the venture was purchased by Birmingham promoter Les Marshall.

Sports teams in Tamworth

Education

There are five secondary schools in Tamworth, a sixth form centre and a branch of South Staffordshire College along with 27 primary schools.

Media

In 1868 The Tamworth Herald was launched by Daniel Addison, with its original premises in Silver Street. Mr Addison continued to publish the paper for nine years until 29 October 1877, when it was taken over by a consortium of leading townsmen. In modern day, the newspaper is owned by Reach Regionals Ltd, a part of Reach PLC. Its reporters also contribute local news stories to the Birmingham Mails website, Birmingham Live in addition to their print based activities.

In recent years the print version of Tamworth Herald has dwindled. The 2020 circulation figures from the Audit Bureau of Circulation show that for that year their circulation was just 4,723 a week. The Tamworth Herald was crowned ‘Newspaper of the Year’ at the Midland Media Awards in both 2016 and 2017.

Online news for Tamworth is provided by Tamworth Informed, an independently owned news service which circulates news articles via its website and various social media platforms.

The BBC Local Radio station covering Tamworth is BBC Radio WM which has its studios in Birmingham. The town has its own community radio station, Radio Tamworth, which broadcasts on 106.8 FM.

Tamworth lies in the BBC West Midlands and ITV Central television regions.

Notable people

Politicians 

 Anthony Dyott (c.1560–1622) lawyer, politician, Recorder of Tamworth from 1598, MP for Lichfield from 1601 to 1621
 John Swinfen (1613–1694) politician and MP variously between 1645 and 1691, elected for Tamworth in 1659, 1661 and 1681
 Thomas Guy (1644 – 27 December 1724) founded almshouses in Tamworth in 1678, which were rebuilt in 1913. He also commissioned Tamworth Town Hall in 1701 and founded Guy's Hospital in London in 1721.
 Sir Robert Peel (1788–1850), a British statesman, served twice as Prime Minister (1834–1835 and 1841–1846) Regarded as the father of modern British policing. MP for Tamworth from 1830 to 1850
 Henry John Roby (1830–1915) classical scholar, writer on Roman law, Liberal MP for Eccles 1890/1895 and a Cambridge Apostle
 Brian Jenkins (born 1942) Labour Party politician, MP for Tamworth from 1997 to 2010
 Phil Bennion (born 1954) farmer, LibDem MEP for the West Midlands from 2012 to 2014
 Christopher John Pincher (born 1969) MP for Tamworth since 2010

Public service and commerce 

 Thomas Blake (c.1597–1657) English Puritan clergyman, controversialist of moderate Presbyterian sympathies.
 John Rawlet (1642–1686) Anglican cleric, preacher and writer of religious literature
 Thomas Sheasby senior (c.1740–1799) civil engineer and contractor, built bridges and canals
 Samuel Parkes, who won the Victoria Cross in the Charge of the Light Brigade, was born in Wigginton and baptised at St. Editha's on 24 December 1815. His parents, Thomas and Lydia, are buried in its churchyard.
 William Gordon Bagnall (1852–1907) mechanical engineer, founded W.G. Bagnall in 1875
 Joseph Adcock (1864–1914) Anglican clergyman and first-class cricketer in New Zealand
 Frederick William Thomas (1867–1956) an English Indologist and Tibetologist
 William MacGregor (1848–1937) Egyptologist, magistrate, Chairman of Tamworth Herald 1906–1928 and Tamworth benefactor.
 Ernest Titterton CMG FRS FAA (1916–1990) was a British nuclear physicist.
 Able Seaman Colin Grazier (1920–1942) posthumously awarded the George Cross for capturing Enigma codebooks
 Alan Edwin Thomas Harper OBE (born 1944) retired Anglican bishop, served in the Church of Ireland as Archbishop of Armagh and Primate of All Ireland from 2007 to 2012
 Joe Grice (born 1952) Chief Economist to the Office for National Statistics

The arts 

 Appleby Matthews (1884–1948) conductor, organist and first conductor of the City of Birmingham Symphony Orchestra
 Bryan Pringle (1935–2002) actor, appeared in television, film and theatre productions
 Clem Clempson (born 1949) rock guitarist, played for Colosseum and Humble Pie
 Sue Coe (born 1951) artist, illustrator and printmaker, lives in Upstate New York
 Phil Bates (born 1953) English musician, member of Trickster and Quill
 Julian Cope (born 1957) musician, author, antiquarian, poet and cultural commentator
 Blaze Bayley (born 1963) singer, musician, songwriter and lead singer of Wolfsbane
 Niki Evans (born 1972) singer, from the fourth series of The X Factor in 2007
 Rebekah Ryan (born 1976) female pop singer and songwriter
 Jemma Palmer (born 1986) an English model and wrestler, signed up to WWE.
 Emma Slater (born 1988) professional dancer/choreographer on Dancing with Stars
 Elizabeth 'Lily' Somerville (born 1993) one half of singer-songwriter duo Ider
 Erin Kellyman (born 1998) actress, known for Solo: A Star Wars Story and The Falcon and the Winter SoldierSport

 Hubert Pearson (1886–1955) goalkeeper, 341 appearances for West Bromwich Albion F.C.
 Harold Pearson (1908–1994) goalkeeper, over 300 pro appearances mainly for West Bromwich Albion F.C.
 Albert Mullard (1920–1984) prisoner of war and footballer, played almost 300 pro games mainly for Port Vale F.C.
 Micky Steele-Bodger CBE (born 1925) former rugby union footballer, played flanker for Harlequins, England and the Barbarians
 Cyril Beech (1925–2001) footballer, 172 club caps mainly for Swansea Town F.C.
 Dave Black (born 1952) long-distance runner, competed in the 1980 Summer Olympics
 Roger Brown (1952–2011) football manager and player, made over 300 pro appearances mainly for Fulham F.C.
 Peter Eastoe (born 1953) former footballer, 350 pro appearances mainly for Everton F.C.
 Steve Fox (1958–2012) footballer, made 278 pro appearances mainly for Wrexham F.C.
 Tony Coton (born 1961) former football goalkeeper, 501 club caps mainly for Watford F.C.
 Kelvin Burt (born 1967) BTCC/F3/Porsche racing driver, ex F1 Test Driver
 David Gilbert (born 1981), professional snooker player
 Ashley Williams (born 1984) football player and captain of Wales football team
 Dan Martin (born 1986) Irish professional racing cyclist.
 Martin Plowman (born 1987), racing driver
 Marc Albrighton (born 1989) English professional footballer, plays for Leicester City F.C.

Other
 Thomas "Bomber" Kavanagh, Irish criminal and a senior member of the crime organisation founded by Christy Kinahan ran his criminal empire from Tamworth.
 James Lees, English ceremonial magician

Freedom of the Borough
The following people and military units have received the Freedom of the Borough of Tamworth.

Individuals
 Alderman Frederick George Allton: 1951.
 Marc Kevin Albrighton: 17 May 2022.
Terence (Terry) Alec Dix: 30 July 2009. Local Councillor from 1967 to 1982 and County Councillor From 1981 to 2009.

Military Units
 Royal British Legion: 2014. 
 Royal Naval Association: 2014. 
 Mercian Regimental Association: 2014.  
 Royal Air Force Association: 2014.
 Tamworth and Wilnecote Unit St. John Ambulance: 25 September 2015.
 The Mercian Regiment.
 The Defence Medical Services.
 RFA Fort Rosalie, Royal Fleet Auxiliary.

See also
Listed buildings in Tamworth, Staffordshire

Notes

References

Bibliography
 J. Gould, "The Medieval Burgesses of Tamworth: their Liberties, Courts and Markets", Transactions of the South Staffordshire Archaeological Society'', No. 13 (1971–72).

External links

 
 Tamworth Information Centre
 Tamworth Informed – Local News organisation
 Tamworth's Local Paper

 
Towns in Staffordshire
Non-metropolitan districts of Staffordshire
Unparished areas in Staffordshire
Former civil parishes in Staffordshire
Boroughs in England